Raccoon Township is a township in Beaver County, Pennsylvania, United States. The population was 2,788 at the 2020 census. It is part of the Pittsburgh metropolitan area.

Geography
Raccoon Township is located in southern Beaver County.

Surrounding neighborhoods
Raccoon Township has eight borders, including Potter Township to the north, Center Township to the east, Hopewell Township to the east-southeast, Independence Township to the southeast, Hanover Township to the south, Greene Township to the west, Shippingport to the northwest, and Industry to the north-northwest.

Demographics

As of the census of 2000, there were 3,397 people, 1,186 households, and 970 families residing in the township.  The population density was 183.3 people per square mile (70.8/km2).  There were 1,227 housing units at an average density of 66.2/sq mi (25.6/km2).  The racial makeup of the township was 98.70% White, 0.38% African American, 0.15% Native American, 0.03% Asian, 0.09% from other races, and 0.65% from two or more races. Hispanic or Latino of any race were 0.71% of the population.

There were 1,186 households, out of which 39.6% had children under the age of 18 living with them, 69.1% were married couples living together, 8.4% had a female householder with no husband present, and 18.2% were non-families. 15.9% of all households were made up of individuals, and 6.2% had someone living alone who was 65 years of age or older.  The average household size was 2.82 and the average family size was 3.15.

In the township the population was spread out, with 27.1% under the age of 18, 6.1% from 18 to 24, 30.8% from 25 to 44, 26.7% from 45 to 64, and 9.3% who were 65 years of age or older.  The median age was 38 years. For every 100 females there were 99.9 males.  For every 100 females age 18 and over, there were 97.0 males.

The median income for a household in the township was $53,036, and the median income for a family was $58,533. Males had a median income of $44,647 versus $22,171 for females. The per capita income for the township was $19,363.  About 5.0% of families and 5.4% of the population were below the poverty line, including 3.6% of those under age 18 and 12.6% of those age 65 or over.

References

External links
Raccoon Township official website

Populated places established in 1833
Townships in Beaver County, Pennsylvania
1833 establishments in Pennsylvania